Chipiona Lighthouse, also known as Punta del Perro Light, is an active 19th-century lighthouse in Chipiona, in the province of Cádiz, Spain. At a height of  it is the seventeenth tallest "traditional lighthouse" in the world, as well as the tallest in Spain. It is located on Punta del Perro (lit.

History
A previous lighthouse was present at the same site from the Roman period, and this former lighthouse gave Chipiona its name. This superb lighthouse was, according to Strabo comparable with the famous Lighthouse of Alexandria. It was ordered to be built in 140 BC by the Roman proconsul Quintus Servilius Caepio in an attempt to finally overcome the problems of the Salmedina reef at the mouth of the then river Betis, now the Guadalquivir. Its Latin name   (Caepio's Tower), is traditionally held to be the origin of the name Chipiona.

The project to build a modern lighthouse on the site was first developed in 1862 by Jaime Font, a Catalan engineer. He placed the first stone on 30 April 1863 and it was lit for the first time in 1867. Since that time it has remained off permanently on 2 occasions. The first when it was switched off was in 1898, during the war against the United States of America over the independence of Cuba, all the lighthouses around Cadiz were turned off because an invasion was feared. The second time was in 1936 during the Spanish Civil War when it remained off for 3 years.

In December 1999 the illumination was changed to a new halogen lamp.

Construction

The building is constructed in a slightly tapering column which is reminiscent of commemorative Roman columns. It is built of blocks of sandstone and oysterstone, a limestone sedimentary rock that is open in structure and with visible remains of mollusc shells, especially of the oyster family. It is used commonly in the south west coastal towns and cities of Spain.
There is a gallery on top in which is the lantern. Its base is a 4-storey square structure, which rises in front of a 2-storey keeper's house, painted white.

The site is open and there are organised tours up the 344 steps to the balcony below the lantern room. These tours are available 5 days a week in summer and less frequently during other months.

Current display

See also

 List of tallest lighthouses in the world
 List of lighthouses in Spain

References

External links

 Comisión de faros 
 Autoridad Portuaria de Sevilla

Lighthouses completed in 1867
Lighthouses in Andalusia
Province of Cádiz
Buildings and structures in Andalusia
1867 establishments in Spain